Adrenergic cell group C1 is a group of cells that show evidence of phenylethanolamine N-methyltransferase (PNMT), the enzyme that converts norepinephrine to epinephrine (adrenalin); thus, they are regarded as 'putative adrenergic cells'. They are found in the ventrolateral medulla in conjunction with the noradrenergic cell group A1. The adrenergic group C1 is seen in vertebrates, including rodents and primates.

References

External links 
 More information at BrainInfo

Adrenaline